Madeleine Morris (born March 29, 1992) is an American voice actress and writer, known for her work on English anime dubs, particularly for Funimation.

Filmography

Anime

Films

Video games

References

External links
 
 

1992 births
Living people
21st-century American actresses
American voice actresses